Claude Le Laboureur (1601–1680s) was a French Roman Catholic clergyman and historian.

Early life
Claude Le Laboureur was born in 1601.

Career
Le Laboureur was the provost of the Abbey of Île Barbe on the Île Barbe in Lyon.

Le Laboureur was the author of books about French history, genealogy, and heraldry. He was also a large book collector.

Death and legacy
Le Laboureur died in the 1675. One of his nephews, Jean Le Laboureur, became a courtier and historian, while another nephew, Louis Le Laboureur, was a poet. Meanwhile, Le Laboureur bequeathed many of his books to local libraries.

References

1601 births
1680s deaths
Clergy from Lyon
17th-century French Roman Catholic priests
17th-century French historians
French genealogists
French heraldists